Tobias Carl Mikael Andersson (born 18 February 1994) is a Swedish footballer who plays as a forward for Gnosjö IF. He has previously represented IFK Värnamo, Östers IF, and Kalmar FF as a goalkeeper on Superettan and Allsvenskan level.

References

1994 births
Living people
Swedish footballers
Association football goalkeepers
IFK Värnamo players
Östers IF players
Kalmar FF players
Superettan players
Allsvenskan players